The term nyönpa ( "mad one(s)"; Sanskrit avadhūta) may refer to a group of Tibetan Buddhist yogis or a single individual belonging to this group. They were mainly known for their unusual style of teaching, to which they owed their names.

Spiritual practices
Recent scholarship has helped to illuminate many distinguishing features of the religious practices the nyönpa; these practices are sometimes referred to in the literature as The Practice of Observance. The Practice of Observance takes as its foundation the philosophy of tulshuk or chöpa or even tulshuk chöpa. This religious philosophy is the common thread in the following spiritual practices of the nyönpa:

The nyönpa is essentially a free spirit who follows the rule of spontaneity and intuition, not subject to any external book of rules....he is one dedicated to renunciation and the path of enlightenment who does not fit within the disciplines and practises of the formal orders.

wandering homeless and taking on a new style of dress and a new mental attitude towards the world;
consuming substances considered impure;
drinking alcohol and eating meat;
singing and dancing;
behaving fearlessly;
engaging in sexual relations.

None of the practises listed above should be taken as mandatory.  

Practices that a nyönpa may avoid include:

reading spiritual texts;
reciting prayers in the usual ways.

Some nyönpa were also famous for the practice of chöd.

Notable examples
There are some recorded historical descriptions of those exhibiting the behavior and spiritual practice of the nyönpa in both Tibet and India including:

Drukpa Kunley
Gendün Gyatso, the Second Dalai Lama
Kalapa, the "Handsome Madman", one of the 84 Mahasiddas
Mekhala and Kankhala, often called the "Two Headless Sisters", also part of the group of the 84 Mahasiddas
Thang Tong Gyalpo
Tsangnyön Heruka
Ü Nyön Kunga Zangpo
Milarepa

Women and the path
There is evidence that women also took inspiration from the spiritual practices and ways of conduct of the nyönpa.

The most famous Tibetan woman exhibiting signs of the path of the nyönpa would be the Tibetan female saint Sönam Peldren who probably lived in the 14th century. Sönam Peldren was eventually understood as an emanation of Vajravārāhī in the female tulku incarnation lineage of the Samding Dorje Phagmo.

Before this, in India, there were three women in the grouping of the 84 Mahasidda whose spiritual behavior would indicate that they practiced according to this spiritual path. They are Lakṣmīṅkarā, the "Crazy Princess", and the "Two Headless Sisters" Mekhala and Kanakhala.

See also

References

Citations

Works cited

Further reading

Tibetan Buddhist practices